Dixie Highway in Palm Beach and Broward counties carries two segments of the State Road 811 (SR 811) designation by Florida Department of Transportation, as well as the local County Road 811 (CR 811) in southeast Florida. The entire road comprises a section of the Dixie Highway, a National Auto Trail which eventually became a former routing of U.S. Route 1 after the route was shifted east to Federal Highway. One segment of SR 811 is in Broward County and the other is in Palm Beach County, Florida. The segments of SR 811 are supplemented by three shorter segments of CR 811, one of which is unsigned.

Route description

Fort Lauderdale to Deerfield Beach

In Broward County, an unsigned segment of CR 811 begins at an intersection with US 1 and SR A1A and travels north along East 3rd Avenue to meet SR 811 at Sunrise Boulevard (SR 838), all within the city of Fort Lauderdale.

The  southern segment of SR 811 extends northward from Sunrise Boulevard (SR 838) in downtown Fort Lauderdale, going north, and ending at an intersection with Hillsboro Boulevard (SR 810) in Deerfield Beach.  The southern segment of SR 811 is mostly known as Dixie Highway, though it goes by variety of names in certain locales: Northeast 4th Avenue in Fort Lauderdale, Wilton Drive in Wilton Manors, and Old Dixie Highway in Oakland Park and Deerfield Beach. The segment of road located in Pompano Beach is maintained by the city as of 2016, and is not part of the state highway system.

North of here, Dixie Highway continues north into Boca Raton and Delray Beach without any state or county designation.

Parallelling both US 1 to the east and Interstate 95 to the west, Dixie Highway is a major north–south commercial access road for northeastern Broward County cities. While much of the property that lines SR 811 is residential in nature, most of the route is adjacent to Florida East Coast Railroad tracks.  Two hospitals (North Ridge Medical Center and the Pompano Beach Medical Center) are on the southern segment of SR 811, south of Pompano Beach Airpark, home base of the Goodyear Blimps.

Boca Raton and Delray Beach

As an undesignated local road, Dixie Highway closely parallels the Florida East Coast Railroad and Federal Highway (US 1), serving as an alternate north–south route to nearby roads in Boca Raton. It continues north into Delray Beach, terminating at 10th Street, where Swinton Avenue continues as a de facto extension northward. In Boca Raton, Dixie Highway serves as the border between "east" and west" street designations and addresses.

West Palm Beach to Jupiter

An unsigned segment of CR 811 begins at an intersection with 45th Street (unsigned CR 702) and Greenwood Avenue, traveling north along Greenwood, which later becomes the President Barack Obama Highway. Both of these roads closely parallel the Florida East Coast Railroad, and are renamed segments of Dixie Highway. In Lake Park, it jogs across the railroad tracks to 10th Street, and transitions to SR 811 at an intersection with Northlake Boulevard, which carries the SR 850 designation to the east and the CR 809A designation to the west.

The divided northern segment of SR 811 extends  from Northlake Boulevard in North Palm Beach to its northern terminus, an intersection with U.S. Route 1 near Tequesta and Jupiter Inlet Colony, a mile north of Jupiter. While FDOT signs indicating the SR 811 designation are posted alongside the road, street signs (mostly overhead) identify it as Alternate A1A or Old Dixie Highway for the entire length of the route.

While the completion of I-95 in the late 1970s has diminished the importance of Alternate A1A as a commercial byway, the replacement of forest by the development of suburban residential districts have made SR 811 an important commuter road in addition to a bypass of US 1.

Major intersections

County Road 811A

Neither a bypass nor a spur, the former State Road 811A, now County Road 811A, is a seven-mile-long stretch of North Andrews Avenue in Fort Lauderdale.  The southern terminus is an intersection with Sunrise Boulevard (SR 838) and the northern terminus is an intersection with Atlantic Boulevard (SR 814).  It provides an alternative north–south commuter route whenever I-95 is clogged with a traffic jam.

With Broward Boulevard (SR 842), Andrews Avenue provides a baseline from which all Fort Lauderdale addresses are determined.  Just west of the northern terminus of CR 811A is the Pompano Park Raceway, the only harness racing track in southern Florida. Within nine six blocks of the southern terminus are Fort Lauderdale and Broward County governments, all of which within a block of the Fort Lauderdale Museum of Discovery and Art and a campus of Broward Community College.

State Road 811A does not intersect with its "parent"; however, in the 1960s, State Road 811 extended along Andrews Avenue southward from SR 838 to US 1.  Had SR 811A been in existence at that time, the two roads would have branched out from Sunrise Boulevard and North Andrews Avenue, but no road map - commercial or governmental - has ever indicated the concurrent existence of SR 811A and the SR 811 extension.

Major intersections

References

External links

811
Dixie Highway
811
811
811
811
U.S. Route 1